Handbridge is a district of Chester, England on the south bank of the River Dee. A settlement has existed on the site since the Iron Age , but the site saw major expansion during the collapse of the Roman occupation of Britain, as the city grew too large for its walls. The site was originally mainly a quarry for the abundant red sandstone that much Chester is built from, but in later years became a centre for salmon fishing in the Dee.

The area runs continuously into Queens Park. Within Handbridge there is a primary school, Overleigh St Mary's, and two secondary schools: Chester Catholic High School and Queens Park High School. There are also colleges, Cheshire College - South and West, formerly known as West Cheshire College and Chester International School (CIS) that provides a range of courses including International Baccalaureate.

History

Roman era

Although there has been some activity on the site since the Iron Age,  the first settlement on the site was built around 74 CE   shortly after the foundation of the fort at Deva, now the Chester city centre. The site was used as a quarry; Handbridge is built on a large sandstone outcrop, material from which was used to construct the city walls and buildings, although the quarry ceased production at the end of the fourth century CE. The quarry was also the site of a small shrine to the goddess Minerva which is still visible in what is known as Edgar's Field. The shrine is protected as a Grade I listed building but has suffered from weathering.

Post-Roman

After the Romans left Britain, the city fell into disrepair. Little is known of Handbridge from this time, as Chester was repeatedly attacked by Viking raiders, leading one commentator to describe it as "an abandoned city on The Wirral". Nevertheless, by the time of the Domesday Book, the site had grown large enough to be divided into three manors: Overleigh, Netherleigh and Royal Handbridge. The book also tells of the constant repairs that had to be made to the river crossing there, the first written record of what would eventually become known as the Old Dee Bridge.

By the Old Dee Bridge is a large field known as Edgar's field; this is one of a few sites that may have been the royal palace of Edgar of England. There is no archaeological evidence of this however. Legend tells that, to pledge an oath to him, six lesser kings rowed him up the Dee to his palace, where they pledged allegiance to the king "on both land and sea".

Middle Ages

The Welsh name for Handbridge is Treboeth, meaning either "the hot town" or "the burnt town". The latter meaning has traditionally been thought to suggest that the town was burnt at some point in its medieval history. However, research in the 21st century suggests that the settlement may have been referred to as "the hot town" because of its long history of metal working.

During the medieval period, multiple river crossings were built on the site of the bridge noted in the Domesday Book to replace others lost to flooding; the current Old Dee Bridge dates from 1353, but at least four other bridges existed on the site beforehand. The bridge became a choke point in Welsh invasions, leading to both ends of the bridge being fitted with sentry posts. Although the bridge formed the only crossing at that point, residents were reluctant to repair the bridge, leading Richard II of England to pay for the crossing to be restored in 1374 "for consideration that as many have been drowned in the water of the Dee since the bridge has been destroyed and broken", being rebuilt with large towers and a drawbridge to further deter Welsh raids.

Chester Weir across the river was built in 1093, under the orders of Hugh Lupus, to provide power to water powered mills along the banks of the river, and to improve the navigability of the river, which was still a major trade route at the time. The mills ran a legally enforced monopoly, with all Cestrians being forced to have their corn ground at these mills. The millers were reputed to be lazy and greedy, taking many times what they should in tithes. The song "Miller of Dee" was written about these millers, which led to "Miller of the Dee" becoming an insult in Mediaeval culture, meaning a thief or a cheat.

English Civil War

During the English Civil War, Chester was one of the last Royalist strongholds, and as such was heavily besieged. Handbridge was burnt once again and the bridge heavily damaged to impede the progress of the Roundhead armies.
In the summer of 1645, with the siege less close, the Royalist defenders built a new fort at Handbridge to protect the approaches to the Dee Bridge.  By September, the besieging Parliamentarian forces had closed in and linked their positions on either side of the River Dee with a bridge of boats from Dee Lane to the Earl's Eye in Handbridge (the "Welsh side"), protected by gun emplacements at the south end.

Victorian era

During the Victorian era many of the corn mills which lined the river closed down, to be replaced with hydroelectric power stations to provide electricity to the growing city. However, the suburb itself was considered a poor area, with one contemporary commentator, John Hemingway, describing the area as "almost exclusively inhabited by the lower orders". The population were primarily industrial workers who worked in the many factories that surrounded Chester, including several tobacco works on the Dee banks, and the neighbouring area of Saltney. However, many of the larger properties in the east of Handbridge, towards Queens Park, were middle and upper class residents who desired attractive riverside properties.

In the extreme west of Handbridge, the Grosvenor Bridge, connecting the city to the main roads to Wales, was built by Thomas Harrison and opened by Queen Victoria in November 1833, as part of a larger trade route to Holyhead and the Irish ports.

20th century

Handbridge continued to grow in the 20th century with several large schools and a college being built to serve the population of Handbridge and Queen's Park, which both underwent major expansion. Among the buildings built were the "Salmon Leap" flats, designed by Gilling Dod and Partners and constructed in 1967/68. On the riverside is a small cottage named "Nowhere", believed to have originally been a secret tavern. However, during a 1963 gig in Chester by The Beatles, John Lennon heard about the house and was intrigued by the name, with the song "Nowhere Man" being inspired by this cottage.

Governance

Cheshire West and Chester
Since 1 April 2009 Handbridge is within the new Cheshire West and Chester unitary authority area; prior to that it was within both Chester City Council and Cheshire County Council boundaries.

Handbridge forms part of the Handbridge Park Cheshire West and Chester ward, which is represented by two councillors:
 Razia Daniels (Conservative)
 Neil Sullivan (Conservative)

The first elections to the council were held on 1 May 2008, with the council acting as a shadow council until the abolition of the Chester City Council and Cheshire County Council authorities on 1 April 2009. The wards of the authority are identical to the previous county council electoral divisions.

Handbridge and Queens Park were formerly a single Chester City Council ward, Handbridge & St Mary's.

United Kingdom Parliament
Handbridge is in the City of Chester parliamentary constituency and is represented by Samantha Dixon of the Labour Party, who held the seat in a by-election in 2022 with an increased majority.

See also

Minerva's Shrine, Chester
St Mary's Church, Handbridge

References

External links

 Handbridge.com – Local Community Website

Populated places established in the 1st century
Areas of Chester
70s establishments in the Roman Empire
1st-century establishments in Roman Britain